Qashan Duchy was once a Bolghar Duchy in modern-day Tatarstan. After the 13th century  Mongol invasion, Bolghar became dependent on Volga Bulgaria and became a vassal state of the Golden Horde.

The capital, Qashan supported a citizen population of agriculturists, craftsmen and tradesmen. Within its castles, clay cooking utensils were discovered, as well as foundries for smelting iron and copper. From 1391 until 1399, Russian river pirates called Pushkin occupied the Duchy.  By 1399, Muscovy troops dominated. In 1438-1440 the Khanate of Kazan reabsorbed the area reuniting the Bolghar lands.

References 

Tatar states
Volga Bulgaria
History of Tatarstan
Vassal and tributary states of the Golden Horde